The Gotha G.I was a heavy bomber used by the Luftstreitkräfte (Imperial German Air Service) during World War I.

Design and development
In mid-1914, Oskar Ursinus, the founder and editor of the German flying magazine Flugsport, began designing a large twin-engine seaplane of unconventional configuration. While most biplane designs have the fuselage attached to the lower wing, Ursinus had a snub-nosed fuselage attached to the upper wing, and twin engine nacelles mounted on the lower one. The purpose of this arrangement was to allow the engines to be kept close together thereby minimizing asymmetrical thrust in the event of an engine failure, although Ursinus later also claimed that this design balanced out the lowering of the centre of pressure as speed increased, and minimised the drag on the upper wing caused by turbulence from the fuselage.

Ursinus was conscripted into the army on 1 August 1914 and little over a week later, presented his commanding officer, Major Helmut Friedel, with the seaplane design adapted into a Kampfflugzeug ("battle aircraft") intended for ground attack duties. Apart from the aerodynamic benefits claimed by Ursinus, the aircraft's unorthodox layout provided excellent views for the three crewmen and broad fields of fire for the gunner. The design also matched the specifications that the Idflieg had issued in March that year for a "Type III" large military aircraft, and Friedel ordered the construction of a prototype.

This aircraft was built by the men his unit, Fliegerersatz Abteilung 3 ("Aviator Replacement Unit 3") and received the Idflieg designation B.1092/14 (the "B" signifying a two-seat unarmed biplane to IdFlieg designation standards), although it was generally known as the FU for "Friedel-Ursinus". It was powered by two 75 kW (100 hp) Mercedes D.I engines, and in keeping with the "Type III" requirement, it was armed with a 7.92 mm (.312 in) machine gun in the nose and the engines and crew were protected by 200 kg (440 lb) of chrome-nickel armor.

The prototype first flew on 30 January 1915 and was inspected by an Idflieg engineer on 20 February. His report confirmed that the aircraft conformed to the specification, and Ursinus' claims about the excellent field of fire and advantages of the design in single-engine operation. However, he also noted that the aircraft was difficult to fly, lacking in structural integrity, dangerous to the crew in the event of a crash landing, and underpowered. Despite its shortcomings, the FU was sent to the front, assigned to Feld Flieger Abteilung 28 reconnaissance unit at Ujatz on the Russian Front in early 1915.

With the design proved under service conditions, the Idflieg issued a contract on 1 April for series production to Gothaer Waggonfabrik AG, which acquired a license from Ursinus, who held the patent to the design. Gothaer chief engineer Hans Burkhard simplified and refined the design, which was originally known as the Gotha-Ursinus-Heeresflugzeug (Gotha Ursinus Army Aircraft), or "GUH," later known as the Gotha G.I or Gotha-Ursinus G.I. The first production aircraft was completed on 27 July 1915. These aircraft were powered by two 110 kW (150 hp) Benz Bz.III engines. Gothaer Waggonfabrik built 18 G.I aircraft in three batches of six before production ceased at the end of the year. The final batch was powered by 120 kW (160 hp) Mercedes D.III engines and featured an extra defensive machine gun and nearly double the armor of previous examples.

A single example of the UWD, or Ursinus-Wasser-Doppeldecker (Ursinus Water Biplane) floatplane version of the G.I was also built, ordered by the Navy in April 1915, and delivered in February 1916; as per Ursinus' original intentions from two years earlier. During a test flight, six men climbed aboard to take the place of ballast. When they emerged after landing, a nearby naval officer likened the aircraft to the Trojan Horse (Trojanisches Pferd in German), and this nickname stuck. It was used operationally until 2 October  when it was written off after a hard landing.

Operational history
Today, little is known about the G.I's service history. Idflieg records show only small numbers ever in service on the front at any one time (the most being five in October and six in December 1915). At this stage of the war, Type G aircraft were being used for a variety of duties, including defensive patrols, reconnaissance, and only rarely for bombing. By the time it reached the front, the Gotha G.I was already an easy target for faster and more maneuverable fighters, and the few pilot recollections that have survived are largely unfavourable to the type.  Manfred von Richthofen served as a machine gunner in a Gotha G.I at Ostend and in Champagne-Ardenne during the First Battle of Champagne with Georg Zeumer as his pilot.

The UWD seaplane is known to have participated in a successful air-raid on Dover sometime in 1916, bombing Langton Fort and the Shoulder of Mutton battery, but the exact date is not now known.

Variants
 FU - (Friedel-Ursinus) - single prototype (B.1092/14) 
 G.I - standard production version
 UWD - (Ursinus Wasser Doppeldecker - Ursinus Water Biplane) - seaplane variant with twin floats (1 only built), also known as the WD.4.

Operators
 
 Armee-Abteilung Falkenhausen
 Fliegerersatz Abteilung 1
 Fliegerersatz Abteilung 3
 Fliegerersatz Abteilung 5
 Fliegerersatz Abteilung 7
 Fliegerersatz Abteilung 37
 Fliegerersatz Abteilung 46
 Kagohl 1
 Kagohl 2, Staffel 8
 Prüfanstalt und Werft
 Sonderstaffel S

Specifications (G.U.H. G.I)

See also

References

Further reading

Twin-engined tractor aircraft
G.I
1910s German bomber aircraft
Aircraft first flown in 1915